is a lake in Ōmachi Nagano Prefecture, Japan. It is one of the "Nishina Three Lakes" (Lake Aoki, Lake Nakatsuna and Lake Kizaki). Its sediments have been studied in an effort to better understand climate change in Japan, finding evidence of the Medieval Warm Period and Little Ice Age.

References

Nakatsuna
Landforms of Nagano Prefecture
Ōmachi, Nagano